Giacomo Bolognini (1664–1734) was an Italian painter of the Baroque period. The nephew of Giovanni Battista Bolognini, he was born in Bologna. Married to Antonia Margherita Contoli, he had two sons, Giovanni Battista and Francesco, and four daughters, Anna, Olimpia, Rosalba and Teresa.

Following tutelage under his uncle, he painted St Francis Receiving the Stigmata for the church of Santi Sebastiano e Rocco in Bologna, and a Dead Christ with Virgin Mary and Mary Magdalen now housed in the National Museum of Bologna. His works can be found in Rome, Mantua, Cesena, Venice, Prague and Cadiz.

In 1715 he was appointed the director of the Clementine Academy.

Notes

References

1664 births
1734 deaths
17th-century Italian painters
Italian male painters
18th-century Italian painters
Painters from Bologna
Italian Baroque painters
18th-century Italian male artists